The  was a title defended in the Japanese professional wrestling promotion Big Japan Pro Wrestling. It was created in 2000. 

There were only three reigns and one vacancy shared between three wrestlers.

History
Established in 2000 by Big Japan Pro Wrestling (BJW), the title was first won by Misae Genki when she defeated Kiyoko Ichiki during the Hardcore Series II tour, on July 2, 2000.

After the closure of the BJW women's division in 2003, the title was retained by Kaori Yoneyama until it was deactivated after her last successful defense over La☆Panda at the Yoshihito Sasaki, Jaki Numazawa and Nikkan Lee 11th Anniversary event on November 9, 2011.

Reigns

See also

Professional wrestling in Japan

References

Big Japan Pro Wrestling championships
Women's professional wrestling championships